Nueva Londres (New London) is a town southwest in the Caaguazú department of Paraguay. It has an area of 883 square kilometers and according to the census of 2002 has 3,875 inhabitants. It is located 137 km from the city of Asuncion.

History

In 1893 two thousand men and women led by William Lane left Australia for Paraguay where they established a utopian socialist colony called "New Australia". The colony was not a success, but their descendants can be found just over 200km from Foz do Iguaçu. Among the settlers were Richard Smith and John Smith.

In October 1957, the town was recognized as a district and after a request to be renamed New Canberra was ignored by the Australian Government, the town was renamed Nueva Londres (Spanish for New London).

Climate
The average temperature in Nueva Londres is 22°C , with a low reaches 0°C in the winter and the maximum is 32°C . The climate is mild with abundant rainfall.

Demography
New London has a total of 4,568 inhabitants , of which 2,392 are men and 2,176 women , according to estimates for 2008 of the DGEEC (Directorate General of Statistics, Surveys and Censuses).

Transportation

Economy
The main activities of the inhabitants are livestock and agriculture.

See also

 Australia–Paraguay relations
 Foreign relations of Australia
 Foreign relations of Paraguay
 Confederados - Brazilians descended from Confederate Americans who fled the United States to Brazil after the American Civil War
 New Australia

Sources
World Gazeteer: Paraguay – World-Gazetteer.com

Populated places in the Caaguazú Department